Dunia Ayaso and Félix Sabroso are a Spanish couple from the Canary Islands who work as screenwriters and film directors.

They started with a theatre company and took some cinematography courses later. Sabroso worked as a television screenwriter and Ayaso made videos before their first movie, Fea.
Dunia Ayaso died on 28 February 2014, age 53.

Filmography
Fea (1994)
Perdona bonita, pero Lucas me quería a mí (Excuse Me Darling, But Lucas Loved Me) (1997)
El grito en el cielo (Shout Out) (1998)
Descongélate! (Chill Out!) (2003)
Chuecatown (Boystown) (2007)
Los años desnudos. Clasificada S (Rated R; The Naked Years: Classified 'S') (2008)
La isla interior (The Island Inside) (2009)

Television
Quítate tú pa ponerme yo (Telecinco)
Mujeres (TVE)

References

External links

Website

Film directors from the Canary Islands
Filmmaking duos
Year of birth missing (living people)